Charles Begore Smith (September 13, 1920 – December 26, 1988) was an American character actor. He was born in Flint, Michigan.

He had notable roles in The Shop Around the Corner (1940) and The Major and the Minor (1942). (He also had a minor singing role in the film In the Good Old Summertime, the 1949 musical remake of "The Shop Around the Corner".) As a tall, gangly young man in his early twenties, he played high schooler Dizzy Stevens, the sidekick of Henry Aldrich, in nine Aldrich Family films between 1941 and 1944. He also played Collins, the senior U.S. Senate page boy in the 1941 film Adventure in Washington. He later had recurring roles in several TV series.

Selected filmography

References

External links

 

1920 births
1988 deaths
American male film actors
Male actors from Michigan
20th-century American male actors